A banana republic is a country dependent on a single, limited-resource export.

Banana republic may also refer to:

Music
 Banana Republic (album), by Francesco De Gregori and Lucio Dalla (1979)
 "Banana Republic" (song), a 1980 single by The Boomtown Rats
 "Banana Republics", a song by Steve Goodman, Jim Rothermel, and Steve Burgh (1976)

Film
 Bananas (film), a 1971 comedy film by Woody Allen, set in a fictional banana republic 
 Bananas!*, a 2009 Swedish documentary

Other uses
 Banana Republic, an American chain of clothing stores 
 Republica de los Bananas, a fictional country in the board game Junta

See also 
Banana (disambiguation)